Ko Kha is a district (amphoe) in the central part of Lampang province, northern Thailand.

Geography
Neighboring districts are (from the south clockwise): Sop Prap, Soem Ngam, Hang Chat, Mueang Lampang, Mae Tha of Lampang Province.

The Khun Tan Range rises in the west and the Phi Pan Nam Range in the east of the district.

History
In 1917 the district was renamed from Sop Yao (สบยาว) to Ko Kha.

Administration
The district is divided into nine subdistricts (tambons), which are further subdivided into 73 villages (mubans). Ko Kha is a township (thesaban tambon) which covers parts of tambons Ko Kha, Sala, and Tha Pha. There are a further nine tambon administrative organizations (TAO).

References

External links
amphoe.com 

Ko Kha